Peter Walsh may refer to:

Politicians
Peter Walsh (Australian politician) (1935–2015), Australian Senator and Finance Minister
Peter Walsh (Victorian politician) (born 1954), Victorian state politician
Peter J. Walsh (1931–1995), politician in Newfoundland and Labrador, Canada
Peter Valesius Walsh (1618–1688), Irish politician and controversialist

Sports
 Peter Walsh (basketball) (born 1954), Australian Olympic basketball player
 Peter Walsh (footballer) (born 1976), Australian rules footballer with Port Adelaide and Melbourne
 Peter Walsh (sports broadcaster), Australian sports commentator

Others
 Peter Walsh (organizer) (born 1956), professional organizer hosting television programs such as Clean Sweep and Enough Already
 Peter Walsh (priest), Irish priest and author
 Peter Walsh (record producer) (born 1960), British music producer
 Peter Milton Walsh, Australian musician
 Peter P. Walsh (1885–1944), Pittsburgh police chief

Fictional
A character in Virginia Woolf's Mrs Dalloway

See also
Walsh (surname)